The Vodla is a river in the south-east of Republic of Karelia, Russia. The town of Pudozh is located along Vodla. The river is formed at the confluence of the rivers Sukhaya Vodla and Vama, two outflows of the Lake Vodlozero, a large freshwater lake in the southeastern part of Karelia. After rising in Lake Vodlozero, the river flows south before turning west into Lake Onega, Europe's second largest lake. From there, the 224-kilometer river Svir connects Lake Onega with Lake Ladoga. The Vodla's water is soft and humic.

References

Rivers of the Republic of Karelia